Heron Preston Johnson is an American artist, creative director, content creator, designer and DJ. Former Nike designer who joined Kanye West's creative team and started his own clothing brand. He is one of the co-founders of the men's streetwear brand Been Trill alongside Virgil Abloh of Off-White fame and Justin Saunders of JJJJound among others. Mostly known for re-branding iconic images, he also designs for his own brand, Heron Preston.

Education
Preston moved to New York in 2004 to attend Parsons School of Design. He graduated in 2007 and stayed in New York to pursue a career in fashion.

Career
Al Moran, one of the founders of the Morán Morán art gallery, discovered Preston through his blog featuring photos of street kids, Al offered him a publishing deal. Preston worked as a marketing specialist and social media director for Nike. He also worked as an art director for Kanye West for whom he designed tour merchandise. Later, he acted as a consultant for West's album The Life of Pablo, as well as on his brand Yeezy.

On September 9, 2016, he launched UNIFORM at the Spring Street Salt Shed in NYC, a catalog of zero waste themed clothes created in collaboration with the NYC Department of the Sanitation(DSNY). In 2017, he opened a pop up shop in Moscow where he sold selected pieces from his collaboration with the DSNY. In 2017, he presented his 2017–2018 fall-winter collection For You, The World at Paris Fashion Week.
In 2018, Preston launched a new collection in collaboration with NASA to celebrate its 60th anniversary. The pieces featured in the collection are inspired by the pressure suits worn by astronauts and feature the NASA "worm" logotype. Preston also runs the e-commerce platform HPC Trading Co, where he features his curated collections of art, music and fashion.

In addition to his career in fashion, Preston is a DJ and has worked for events organized by brands such as GQ, Ford, Sprite and Supreme. He also participated in large scale events and festivals, such as Coachella, Ultra and Fool's Gold Day Off. In 2016, Preston released ONE HUNDO, a mixtape including music from Zomby, Kanye West, Beyoncé and Drake.

In 2017, Preston published Honorable Profession, a limited edition of a zine of convicts and crime scenes photos taken of his father while he was a police officer, which were taken in the 1980s and 1990s in Bayview-Hunters Point, San Francisco. These pictures were featured as a series of large print in the BORROWED TIME group art show in Los Angeles.

In 2018, Preston collaborated with Carhartt WIP on a capsule collection, which juxtaposes workwear and luxury.

Heron Preston collaborated with Justin Timberlake for the singers' 2018 Man of The Woods Tour merchandise.

Company logo 'CTИЛЬ'
Many items from the Heron Preston collections (with the exception of limited capsule collections) are decorated with a print or embroidery with the word "style" in Cyrillic. Heron himself noted that this idea came to him in 2014, when he helped a friend in an exhibition dedicated to the hip-hop culture of the 90s. Heron was tasked with creating merchandising t-shirts. Preston was looking for something that was common in the hip-hop culture of the 90s for a long time, and came to the conclusion that this is a style. And Preston decided to write "style" in Cyrillic because of his obsession with Russian culture and paraphernalia.

See also 
 New Guards Group

References 

 Heron Preston talks to Replica Man

External links 
 

American fashion designers
21st-century American artists
Parsons School of Design alumni
Living people
1983 births